Yom Tov Lipman Lipkin (1840 – ) was a Lithuanian Jewish mathematician and inventor.  He was the youngest son of notable Rabbi Yisroel Salanter, the father of the Musar movement.

Lipkin is best known for the Peaucellier–Lipkin linkage which was partly named after him.
The device is also known as the "Lipkin parallelogram".
Lipkin discovered the linkage independent from Peaucellier in 1871.
A model of Lipkin's invention was exhibited at the exposition at Vienna in 1873, and was later secured from the inventor by the Museum of the Institute of Engineers of Ways of Communication, St. Petersburg.

Biography  
Lipkin was born in Salantai, department of Kovno, in 1846.  He became interested in science and mathematics since childhood.  Not knowing any European language, he had to derive his information from Hebrew books alone.  He later mastered German and French and went to study at University of Königsberg at the age of 17.  He received a Ph.D. degree at Jena University with a thesis titled "Ueber die Räumlichen Strophoiden." He then moved to St. Petersburg, to work at University of St. Petersburg and continue his studies under Pafnuty Chebyshev.  Soon afterwards he died in 1876 from smallpox.

Lipkin broke from traditional Jewish life, but kept interests in Jewish affairs and published in Ha-Tsefirah newspaper.

References

 Simona-Mariana Cretu, Gigi-Dragos Ciocioi-Troaca, Emil Soarece, and Eugen Marian Paun, Mechanical Models for Anti-Rhomb Linkage, in Explorations in the History of Machines and Mechanisms, Springer, 2012, pp. 421–430. 
 Alan T. Levenson, Roger C. Klein, An Introduction to Modern Jewish Thinkers: From Spinoza to Soloveitchik, Rowman & Littlefield Publishers, 2006. 
 I. Etkes, Rabbi Israel Salanter and the Mussar Movement: Seeking the Torah of Truth, Magness Press, Hebrew University of Jerusalem, 1982.

1846 births
1876 deaths
19th-century Lithuanian mathematicians
Lithuanian Jews
Scientists from Kaunas
University of Jena alumni
Academic staff of Saint Petersburg State University
People from Salantai
People of the Haskalah